Avichay Adraee (Hebrew: אביחי אדרעי, Arabic: أفيخاي أدرعي; born in 1982) is a Lieutenant Colonel in the Israel Defense Forces who serves as the head of the Arab media division of the IDF Spokesperson's Unit. As a result of his position, he receives extensive exposure in the Arab media and is known throughout the Arab world. He is of Syrian Jewish, Iraqi Jewish, and Turkish Jewish descent.

Biography

Adraee was born in 1982 in Haifa. His maternal grandparents immigrated from Iraq, his grandmother from his father's side immigrated from Turkey, and his grandfather from his father's side was born in Mandatory Palestine. He studied at the Hebrew Reali School in Haifa. When he enlisted in the IDF, he served in Unit 8200 in the Intelligence Corps. When he reached the rank of Staff Sergeant at the age of 22, he was offered his current position - the head of the Arab media department in the IDF Spokesperson's Office following the Israeli disengagement from Gaza. Adraee was then sent to an Officer's Training School and was promoted to the rank of Major. In November 2018 he was promoted to the rank of lieutenant colonel.

He has been in his current position since 2005, and since then has been interviewed hundreds of times on various Arab television channels, such as Al Jazeera. Adraee is considered a familiar figure in the Arab world, and in addition to his activity on Arab television, he runs accounts on social media.

References

External links
 

 1982 births
Israeli military personnel
21st-century Israeli military personnel
Israeli Mizrahi Jews
 Israeli people of Syrian-Jewish descent
 Israeli people of Iraqi-Jewish descent
Israeli people of Turkish-Jewish descent
Living people